Since the early 2000s, Doha, the capital of Qatar has been undergoing an extensive expansion in its transportation network including the addition of new highways, the construction of a new airport, and the under-construction Doha metro. These projects are meant to keep up with the population's rapid growth, which has strained the country's current infrastructure.

Roads

Doha has a comprehensive road network made up primarily of two and three-lane dual carriageways (divided highways). As a result of Doha being a relatively young city circling a central area, a majority of main streets are inordinately wide highway-like motorways that usually include service roads and large medians. While traditionally roundabouts have been used as intersections in the city, they are being rapidly phased out for signalized intersections as they are proving ineffective at regulating the increased traffic flow in turn overloading the city's road network. Most major roundabouts have been either converted to intersections or interchanges.

Highways
There are five main highways connecting Doha to its neighboring cities. These are the Dukhan Highway to the west of the city, the Al-Shamal Road, connecting Doha to the north of the country, the Al Khor Coastal Road, connecting Doha to the northern town of Al Khor, and the Al Wakrah/Mesaieed Road, connecting Doha to the south of the country. Finally, Salwa Road runs through south Doha and connects the city to the Saudi border to the south of the country.

These highways are all currently undergoing expansion, and are being expanded within Doha itself.

Doha Expressway (D-Ring Road/Al Shamal Road)
The Al Shamal-Road has traditionally connected to the D‑Ring Road in Doha, a three-lane dual carriageway that connects the city on a north-south axis. However, as a result of congestion, the D‑Ring Road is being converted into a major highway through the city, and its name has been changed to the Doha Expressway, connecting Doha as a whole and connecting Doha with the north of Qatar. Several phases of the expressway have been completed, including the Al Shamal Bridge, the Landmark Interchange, the Gharaffa Interchange, and the Midmac/Salwa Road Interchange.

The Al Shamal Road is also undergoing significant expansion as part of the Doha Expressway project. The road is being expanded into a four-lane highway (a total of eight lanes) with major interchanges which will better serve the country than the existing two-lane dual carriageway. Furthermore, the new Doha Expressway will connect Doha with the planned Qatar-Bahrain Friendship Bridge at al-Zubara, connecting the two Persian Gulf states in a similar manner Bahrain and Saudi Arabia are currently connected.

Al Khor Coastal Road
Commutes between Doha and the municipality of Al Khor are currently facilitated Al Khor Coastal Road, which runs through Al Daayen.

Lusail Expressway
The Lusail expressway is expected to connect the new city of Lusail, currently being constructed north of Doha, to central Doha, along with connecting the Pearl island to the mainland. The expressway is expected to take the path along the former Istiqlal Road, now Lusail Street, and will be a 4‑lane dual carriageway passing through the city. The expressway will extend from Lusail City, through Rainbow roundabout, the Qatar Sports Club roundabout, and the fire department roundabout.

Dukhan Highway
Doha is linked to the country's western settlements, namely Dukhan, through Dukhan Highway. The Public Works Authority carried out the Dukhan Highway Central Project in 2017 to enhance the road network.

Salwa Highway
The Salwa Highway project's first phase has been completed. This phase involved the expansion of the highway, which connects Doha to the southwestern town of Salwa on the Saudi Arabian border, into a four-lane highway with grade separated interchanges. The rest of Salwa Road is expected to be expanded and upgraded, from the recently completed Industrial Area Interchange to the Jaidah flyover, including the construction of an underpass at the Ramada signals, Doha's busiest traffic light intersection. This project is not expected to commence until after the completion of the Doha Expressway.

F-Ring Road
The F‑Ring Road will be the sixth ring road in Doha, and is being constructed as part of the transportation network leading to the New Doha International Airport. The new highway will connect the airport to the corniche at the new Ras Abu Aboud interchange, currently under construction, and will involve a new ring road south of the E‑Ring Road.

Taxis
The state-owned Mowasalat company was founded in 2004 to run the country's public transportation. It operates all taxis in Qatar under the "Karwa" brand, with thousands of taxis in the capital. Taxi stands are usually found near malls and shopping centers. In the past difficulties arose in finding Karwa taxis due to the small number of taxis available at launch, which gradually replaced all privately owned taxis.

Fares start at 10 riyals(25Qar from the airport) and the majority of taxis are sedans such as the Toyota Camry and  Škoda Octavias. Most airport taxis at the Doha International Airport are Ford Freestars.

Bus networks

Public bus network
An extensive bus system solely operated by the state-owned Mowasalat commenced in October 2004. It runs in the city of Doha and most of the major towns with one route that terminates as far as the Saudi border. The system covers many areas of the capital city with varied bus stop configurations ranging from open stops to semi-covered and enclosed. The system is mainly used by lower-income segments as the network connectivity is not always feasible and most buses route to the main bus stop - which in itself is a semi-covered non-air conditioned space. This clubbed with the fact that most people prefer to use their private vehicles has not led to a major shift of the city's population to public networks. However, the Doha metro is expected to change that.

The main bus terminal is located in the Souqs area of downtown Doha with services operating to all major towns in Qatar. Mowasalat operates a total of 50 routes starting as early as 4am with last buses timed to depart around 11pm. It also offers three routes that cover major stops terminating at the new Hamad International airport in Doha. The fleet also has buses that run on natural gas, having launched the region's first CNG-fuelled buses. Mowasalat also provides transportation for public schools with a fleet of over 1800 buses. The company states that it plans to expand nationwide through six major bus stations, 16 depots and 1000 buses by 2020.

Shuttle network (West bay) 
Qatar's Ministry of Transport launched this shuttle service for the West Bay district to help ease congestion in this business district. It has been operated by state-owned transport company, Mowasalat. It provides a transport choice for tourists and residents alike and was expanded in 2016 to cover more areas in the district. The single route network operates from 6 am to 9 pm with a frequency of 15 minutes. Initially launched as a free service with two lines, both the blue line and the red line have been combined into a single route pay and use facility. The route was introduced with the objective to ease the parking challenges in the congested district which houses Ministries, government organizations, corporate towers, hotels, embassies & sports clubs.

Some landmarks covered along the route include, Khalifa International Tennis and Squash Complex, The Doha Exhibition and Convention Center (DECC), Dafna Towers, Ministry of Justice tower, Public Works Authority (Ashghal) buildings, Sheraton grand Doha resort and convention center, City Center shopping mall, General Post office building and several government ministries towers.

Tourist network (Doha Bus) 
Doha Bus is a private operated hop on hop off service established in the spring of 2013. The network has a fleet of double-decker buses and has been designed to provide a flexible approach to discovery the capital. The major interest points covered on these routes include;

- Souq Waqif (traditional market) 

- Museum of Islamic art

- Katara Cultural Village

- Pearl Island

- Education city (Qatar Foundation)

- City center (major shopping mall)

- Grand Mosque

- Doha Corniche (water front promenade)

- Qatar National Convention Center

Railways
The Qatar Integrated Railway Project covers four metro lines in Doha, tram routes in West Bay and Lusail, a high-speed line, and dedicated freight railways.

Doha Metro

The first line to open, the Red Line, opened on 8 May 2019 for travel from al Qassar station to al Wakra (13 stations).

A four-line, 300-kilometer (190 mi) metro is under construction. Construction work on the Msheireb station—planned as the system hub— began on October 10, 2012. The system will include commuter lines, four light rail lines, and a people mover. In August Qatar Rail signed five contracts totaling 1.48 billion riyals for work on the first phase of the metro, which covers 129 route-kilometers including the Red, Green, and Gold lines. The contracts were awarded to Porr/Saudi Binladin/HBK Contracting (enabling works), Jacobs Engineering (Red Line), Louis Berger/Egis Group (Gold Line and main stations), Hill International (Green Line), and Lloyd's Register (safety assessment). According to the CEO of Qatar Rail, Phase 1 is due to open in the fourth quarter of 2019, well ahead of the 2022 FIFA World Cup.

Overall, Doha Metro will consist of four lines: in addition to the Red Line, the Gold Line and the Green Line will be built in the first phase; the Blue Line is expected to be completed in the second phase. Msheireb Station will be the point of intersection for all of the metro lines.

The Red Line (also known as Coast Line) will extend through Doha, running from Al Wakrah to Al Khor. It is separated into two divisions: Red Line North and Red Line South. The former will run from Mushayrib Station to Al Khor City, over a length of 55.7 km. Doha Metro's Green Line will connect Doha to Education City and is also known as the Education Line. Starting in Old Airport, the Gold Line (also known as Historic Line) will end in Al Rayyan and cover a distance of 30.6 km. Lastly, the Blue Line, or City Line, will only cover the city of Doha, and is planned to be circular with a length of 17.5 km.

Lusail LRT

It will connect to the Doha metro. The opening of the Lusail LRT is expected for 2020.

West Bay Tram
Doha's West Bay neighborhood is also getting a transit system, an  catenary-free tramway, which will also serve Education City. The turnkey-system, constructed by Siemens and utilizing its latest Avenio tramcars with supercapacitor technology, was opened on 24 December 2019.

Gulf Railway

The Gulf Railway is a proposed railway project that would connect the six Arab member states of the Gulf Cooperation Council (GCC)—Bahrain, Kuwait, Oman, Qatar, Saudi Arabia, United Arab Emirates—of the Persian Gulf. It is planned to be operational by 2017. A monorail system is expected to be the first to open, and will carry passengers between Bahrain and Saudi Arabia. According to initial planning documents, the metro lines will be mostly underground, which could be a challenge for engineers due to the high water table.

Aviation

Doha International Airport was Qatar's International airport until 2014. It was the hub of Qatar Airways, and was also served by many other International airlines. Because of the rapid growth in Qatar and the rapid growth of Qatar Airways, the airport was deemed too small and inadequate for the traffic that went through. This problem was addressed with a large expansion that was made in anticipation of the 15th Asian Games. The airport's facilities were expanded significantly, including the construction of a separate first and business class terminal. Furthermore, parking bays had been constructed on the opposite side of the runway to handle additional air traffic. All these changes had temporarily eased the problem but because of the airport's small size and limited space for expansion, it was not effective to permanently solve the crowding problem.

Hamad International Airport constructed about 4 km East of the former airport replaced it as the only International airport in Qatar This airport has been partially built out at sea on 60% reclaimed land. Next to the airport 100 hectares have been set aside for an Airport City. Commenced in 2006, the initial phases of the airport are completed and the third phase is ongoing. It received its first passengers in 2014 and when completed it will be able to accommodate around 50 million passengers annually. The new airport is located on the shore, further away from the central areas of the city than the current airport, reducing noise and environmental pollution. 2 parallel runways are operational, the western one being the eighth longest in the world at 4850 meters. The airport's 600,000 sq m passenger terminal has a check-in hall that comprises a 25,000 sq m column-free space with around 130 check-in counters. One of the largest maintenance hangars worldwide is located at the airport said to be able to cater to 13 aircraft at once. This airport is also one of the first ever designed specifically for the double-deck Airbus A380.

References

Transport in Doha